Von hier an blind (German for Blind from here on) is the second album by Wir sind Helden, released on 4 April 2005 in Germany. The album entered the German top 100 album charts at #1 on 18 April and remained in the top 10 for twenty weeks. It also reached #1 in Austria, and #5 in Switzerland. The album also reached #16 on the iTunes' US album charts.

Four singles have been released from the album: "Gekommen um zu bleiben" (28 February 2005), "Nur ein Wort" (17 May 2005), "Von hier an blind" (26 September 2005) and "Wenn es passiert" (13 January 2006).

The CD's enhanced CD section features a couple of short videos from the production of the album.

Following the album's success in Germany and Austria, Wir sind Helden recorded several songs from the album in English, French and Japanese, for possible releases in non-German-speaking countries. "Sā Itte Miyō", a Japanese version of "Von hier an blind", was released as a B-side on the "Von hier an blind" single.

The entire artwork (cover, booklet, etc.) for the album as well as for the singles was designed by Berlin illustrator Vanessa Karr. It was modeled after parts from the comic book Tintin in Tibet (1960) by Belgian artist Hergé who died in 1983. Notably, the video for the album's title single "Von hier an blind" is in the same style.

Track listing
All songs were written by Wir sind Helden.

Limited Edition
The album was also released in a limited edition, which included an additional DVD with a documentary, interviews with the band members about each of the album's songs, and a game where one can switch the band's instruments on a performance of "Nur ein Wort".

Charts

Weekly charts

Year-end charts

References
  laut.de interview (in German)
  "Neue deutsche Auslandswelle", Der Spiegel #38/2005, p. 175

External links
Von hier an blind lyrics
Music video of the English version of the single Von hier an blind (RealPlayer)

2005 albums
Wir sind Helden albums
Virgin Records albums
German-language albums